Noble is an English surname which commonly appears in multiple areas of the United Kingdom. The surname first appears in 1199, during the reign of Richard I and it is common in Edinburgh, Scotland.

Notable people 
Notable people with the surname include:

 Alfred Noble (engineer) (1844–1914), American civil engineer
 Sir Andrew Noble, 1st Baronet (1831–1915), Scottish physicist
 Ann C. Noble, sensory chemist and retired professor from the University of California, Davis
 Arthur Noble (1695–1746), Lieutenant-Colonel of the Massachusetts Bay Colonial Militia
 Anne Noble, a New Zealand photographer
 Bill Noble, an Australian rugby league footballer
 Brian Noble (disambiguation)
 Brian Noble (bishop) (1936–2019), British Roman Catholic bishop
 Brian Noble (American football) (born 1962), American football player
 Brian Noble (rugby league) (born 1961), English rugby league player and coach
 Chelsea Noble, American actress
 Christina Noble (born 1944), Irish children's rights campaigner
Dave Noble (1900–1983), American football running back
 David Noble (disambiguation)
David A. Noble (1802–1876), U.S. Representative from Michigan
David F. Noble (1945–2010), historian of technology
David L. Noble, engineer at IBM who invented the floppy disk
David W. Noble (1925–2018), historiographer and historian of thought
David Noble (Australian footballer) (born 1967), former Fitzroy AFL player
David Noble (canyoner) (born 1965), canyoner and discoverer of the Wollemi Pine
David Noble (footballer, born 1982), football player for St. Albans City F.C.
 Denis Noble (born 1936), British physiologist and emeritus professor at the University of Oxford
 Dudy Noble (1893–1963), American athlete, coach, and administrator
 Elmer Noble (1909–2001), American biologist
 Emma Noble (born 1971), actress and model, former daughter-in-law of Sir John Major
 Frank Noble (born 1945), footballer who played for Peterborough United
 Gene Noble, American R&B singer
 Gladwyn Kingsley Noble (1894–1940), American zoologist
 Guy Noble, Australian conductor and pianist
 Sir Iain Noble, 3rd Baronet (born 1935), champion of Gaelic from Skye
 James Noble (senator) (1785–1831), 19th century U.S. senator
 James Noble (actor) (1922–2016), 20th century U.S. actor
 James H. Noble (1851–1912), American physician and politician
 Jamie Noble (born 1976), professional wrestler
 John Noble (born 1948), Australian actor
 John H. Noble, American inmate of the Soviet Gulag at Vorkuta
 Jordan Bankston Noble, (1800–1890) African-American soldier, public speaker, and former slave
 Lee Noble, British car designer and owner of Noble Automotive
 Marc Noble
 Mark Noble (born 1987), English footballer
 Maurice Noble, animation artist
 Matthew Noble (1818–1876), British sculptor
 Mike Noble (1930–2018), British comic artist and illustrator
 Morgan Noble, American politician
 Monty Noble (1873–1940), Australian cricketer
 Percy Noble (Royal Navy officer) (1880–1955), Royal Navy officer who served in both World Wars
 Ray Noble (1903–1978), British bandleader, composer and actor
 Ray Noble (baseball) (1919–1998), Cuban baseball player
 Rayner Noble (born 1961), American college baseball coach
 Reg Noble (1895–1962), former NHL Hockey player
 Redman (born Reginald Noble in 1970), American rapper
 Richard Noble (born 1946), Scottish former land speed record holder
 Ross Noble (born 1976), British stand-up comedian, born in Cramlington, England
 Sierra Noble (born 1990) Canadian musician
 T. Tertius Noble (1867–1953), British organist and composer
 Trisha Noble (born 1944), Australian singer and actress
 Warren Noble (inventor), inventor of electric stove
 William Noble (disambiguation)
William H. Noble (1788–1850), United States Representative from New York
William Noble, 1st Baron Kirkley (1863–1935), English shipowner
William Noble (missionary) (1866–1945), American missionary in Korea
William Bonneau Noble (1780–1831), English landscape painter
William Clark Noble (1858–1938), American sculptor
William Noble (jockey) (1814–1897), English jockey

Fictional characters

 Donna Noble, a character in Doctor Who

References 

English-language surnames
Surnames of Lowland Scottish origin
Surnames from nicknames